The 1937–38 season was the 61st Scottish football season in which Dumbarton competed at national level, entering the Scottish Football League and the Scottish Cup.

Scottish League

Dumbarton made another encouraging start to their 15th season in a row in the Second Division, with only one defeat in their first 8 games. Although that form wasn't maintained fully, Dumbarton had their best season for a number of years by finishing 7th out of 18, with 39 points – 20 behind champions Raith Rovers.  For the fifth time, Dumbarton maintained an unbeaten home league record, but with only 3 wins from 17 fixtures away from Boghead, promotion was never going to be a real possibility.

Scottish Cup

Dumbarton came up against first division Kilmarnock in the first round and despite a good fight were to finish up second best.

Friendly

Player statistics

|}

Source:

Transfers

Players in

Players out 

In addition John Glass, James Mitchell, David Ogilvie, Willie Parlane, Alex Scott and Alex Young all played their last games in Dumbarton 'colours'.

Source:

References

Dumbarton F.C. seasons
Scottish football clubs 1937–38 season